Vaini is a district of Tongatapu division, Tonga.

References 

Tongatapu